Ricardo Samuel Goldstein, most commonly known as Samuel Goldstein, is a Brazilian businessman and founder of a series of companies in varied fields, such as Security Beverages Americas, and consulting and advisory companies Gold & Bell, and notedly one of Founders of Trump Realty Brazil, together with American billionaire Donald Trump.

Early life
Samuel Goldstein, was born May 10, 1966, in Rio de Janeiro, State of Rio de Janeiro, Brazil, into a traditional Jewish immigrant family from Egypt and Lebanon. He was educated at Colégio GIMK (Grupo Integrado Magdalena Khan).

Goldstein spent his early youth between Colombia, Uruguay and Brazil, where his father Sami Goldstein relocated as an IBM executive. Later, in his high school years, they lived in Wellesley, MA and White Plains, NY. He then returned to Brazil and began a four-year Bachelor of Business Administration program at Universidade Santa Úrsula. There, he also attended two years of Electrical Engineering Studies. He graduated with honors from USU in 1988.

He holds a specialization in Finance from the prestigious Fundação Getúlio Vargas and has completed a Harvard Business School LNV course with a specialization in entrepreneurship. He is a Brazilian Citizen and speaks fluent English and Spanish and can communicate fairly in French.

Career

While still at USU he founded Microfix; the first combined PC and Apple maintenance and support center in Rio de Janeiro, which he later sold to one of the largest IBM resellers in Brazil, SPE DATA.

He has also branched into several areas of business, including civil construction, Internet-based services, general contracting, food and beverage importing and distribution and wholesale construction materials. He brought to Rio de Janeiro and was the exclusive distributor of RENNER / Du Pont paints, where he introduced the brand to the construction market and created the concept stores CENTRO DE PINTURAS, later widely spread by RENNER all over Latin America.

During the height of the "dot com" bubble burst, he founded Construbid.com (online marketplace for civil construction supplies), later joining forces with a few important Brazilian groups, with initial investments from IDEIASNET, the first Brazilian internet fund to go public in BOVESPA, and, CEMEX, (the world's largest cement and concrete company) which invested in the business valuating it at $18 Million. The marketplace was later acquired by some of the investors and evolved into a buying portal development company for the construction industry, which has been building these services for the main companies in this market.

He was the co-founder of Trump Realty Brazil together with Brazilian entrepreneur Ricardo Bellino and real-estate mogul Donald Trump in his first venture in Latin America, a $200 Million development called Villa Trump in São Paulo; all of which was fully funded by two Brazilian venture groups, Ventura, owned by founders of Achè Laboratories and Aktiv, from the founders of Chocolates Garoto (acquired by Nestlé).

In 2006 left his executive duties as the CFO of Trump Realty Brazil, but remained on the board of directors and as a major shareholder. Later that year he teamed up with Ernst & Young and international businessman Ricardo Bellino to create The Entrepreneurs Institute (INEMP); to promote entrepreneurship in Brazil and the Entrepreneurs of the Year Awards.
He and his partners successfully sold Trump Realty Brazil to a large Brazilian investment consortium that same year.

Between 2006 and 2009, he and Mr. Bellino, under the umbrella of their consulting company Gold&Bell, developed and launched the School of Life project, an entrepreneurship educational and motivational program that was taught on over 700 schools of the Microlins chain, the largest network of professional training franchises in Brazil. The project has spun off and is currently and independent education platform, on and offline, with partnerships with entrepreneurial groups in Spain and Silicon Valley. In this same period, they have also developed a project called Casas Brasileiras, a partnership with wholesaler giant Ponto Frio, building company Tenda and TV Record television network, promoting the sales of homes, appliances and financial services for Brazilian expatriates in the USA.

In 2007, he co-founded with the legendary inventor of the super models, John Casablancas, creator of Elite Models, the StarSystem project, that came to be one of the most active and successful model scouting projects in the world. He also managed the business during its startup period of almost one year.

In 2009 he launched in Brazil the first anti-hangover drink, developed by French scientists in 1996 and commercialized under the name Security Feel Better.

In January 2010, he launched Security Feel Better in the United States of America and also in LATAM.

In the beginning of 2012, he advised a group of investors in the acquisition and re-structuring of Loosho.com, the first Brazilian makeup e-commerce, and, later in that same year, joined the company as a partner, jointly heading the operation with designer and cosmetics market expert Suzana Rosenfeld, re-vamping platform, ERP, logistics, digital marketing and expanding from make-up to a diversity of products, positioning the company to be one of the leading e-tailers in the country.

In 2014, he advised an important family office, the Mega Group, and was invited to join the group as a partner and Chief of Business Development.

In 2015, he was given the mission of managing MEGA/Transreta, the heavy equipments rental operation of the Mega Group and Lorentzen Group, which is undergoing a massive restructuring and turnaround process due to adversities in the economy and specially on its main client base, the construction, oil&gas and infra-structure sectors.

In 2018, after finishing a complete turnaround of MEGA/Transreta, was invited by one of its former shareholders (Grupo LORINVEST) to structure a distressed assets fund, and, to oversee new investment opportunities. This new division is called AKRON CAPITAL.

References

External links
Mega Transreta

Living people
1966 births
Brazilian chief executives
Brazilian Jews
Businesspeople from Rio de Janeiro (city)